Panaspis duruarum is a species of lidless skinks in the family Scincidae. The species is found in Cameroon.

References

Panaspis
Reptiles described in 1949
Reptiles of Cameroon
Endemic fauna of Cameroon
Taxa named by Albert Monard